Anam Hashim is an Indian professional streetbike freestyle athlete. She is the only Indian stunt athlete to win an international stunt competition in 2017. She is known as the first woman who rode to Khardung La on a TVS Scooty alone and also led a group of 10 women to Khardungla in 2016 during the Himalayan Highs. She made her debut in Cross Country Rally Racing at Desert Storm 2019 and is preparing for 2021 race season.

References 

1995 births
Living people
People from Lucknow
Indian stunt performers